The Big Merino is a  tall concrete merino ram, located in Goulburn, New South Wales, Australia. Nicknamed "Rambo" by locals, the Big Merino contains a gift shop on the ground floor and a wool display on the second floor. Visitors can climb to the top and look out through the Merino's eyes to view the local area.

The Big Merino was officially opened on 20 September 1985 at No.98 Hume St, Goulburn, approximately 800 metres north-east of its current location.

In 1992, the Hume Highway bypassed Goulburn, which resulted in a loss of 40 busloads of tourists to the Big Merino complex per day. On 26 May 2007, the Big Merino was moved to a location closer to the Hume Highway to increase visitor numbers, and is now located near the freeway interchange at a service station. Today, a drive-through car wash occupies Rambo's original location.

See also

Australia's big things
List of world's largest roadside attractions

References

External links
 www.bigmerino.com.au

Big things in New South Wales
Buildings and structures in Goulburn, New South Wales
Animal sculptures in Australia
Concrete sculptures in Australia
1985 sculptures
1985 establishments in Australia
Sheep in art